Ivongo is a town and commune in Madagascar. It belongs to the district of Ivohibe, which is a part of Ihorombe Region. The population of the commune was estimated to be approximately 5,000 in 2001 commune census.

Ivongo has a riverine harbour. Only primary schooling is available. Farming and raising livestock provides employment for 49.9% and 49.9% of the working population. The most important crop is rice, while other important products are bananas, sugarcane and cassava. Services provide employment for 0.2% of the population.

It is connected with Ihosy in the west, and Farafangana in the east by the largely unpaved Route nationale 27.

See also
Pic d'Ivohibe Reserve and the Andringitra National Park that are nearby

References and notes 

Populated places in Ihorombe